The Southwestern Oklahoma State Bulldogs (also SWOSU Bulldogs) are the athletic teams that represent Southwestern Oklahoma State University, located in Weatherford, Oklahoma, in NCAA Division II intercollegiate sports. The Bulldogs compete as members of the Great American Conference for all 10 varsity sports.

Varsity teams

List of teams

Men's Sports
 Baseball
 Basketball
 Football
 Golf
 Rodeo

Women's Sports
 Basketball
 Cross Country
 Golf
 Rodeo
 Soccer
 Softball
 Volleyball
 Track & Field

Individual sports

National Championships
SWOSU has won national championship titles in women’s basketball (1982, 1983, 1985, 1987, 1990), football (1996), men's rodeo (1985, 1992, 1993, 1999) and women's rodeo (1998, 1994).  And the SWOSU baseball team were runners-up for the national championship in the NAIA World Series (1958).
SWOSU was N.A.I.A. Division One   National Champion  in football in  1996 and National Runner-up  in  1977.

Alumni
Carl Birdsong, former NFL punter
Ray Burris, former MLB pitcher
Shane Drury, former PRCA bullrider
Gordon Gore, NFL player
V'Keon Lacey, American football player
Grady Lewis, former NBA player
Cord McCoy, PBR bullrider and runner-up on The Amazing Race
Rex Ryan, former head coach for the Buffalo Bills
Rob Ryan, former defensive assistant for the Buffalo Bills
Arnie Shockley, former professional football player
Jim Simmons, NFL player
Rocky Walcher, former PGA Tour golfer

References

External links